WJCS (89.3 FM) is a religious formatted, non-commercial radio station in Allentown, Pennsylvania.  Its slogan is "Your station for inspiration".  The station is owned by Beacon Broadcasting Corporation, a not-for-profit corporation. It is affiliated with Moody Broadcast Network, and approximately 85% of its programming originates with Moody.

In 2018, WJCS added two additional translators, W292EQ serving Lehigh Township on 106.3 FM and W293CP serving Kutztown on 106.5 FM.

See also
Media in the Lehigh Valley

External links
 WJCS Official Site
 

JCS
Radio stations established in 1990
1990 establishments in Pennsylvania